The Nine Songs Contemporary Children's Literature Award (九歌現代少兒文學獎), or Nine Songs Children's Literature Award (九歌儿童文学奖), is an award for children’s literature created in Taiwan. Eligible works should be between 40,000-45,000 words, and suitable to children aged 10–15 years. Also known as the ChiuKo Award.

History
The award was launched in 1992 by the Jiu Ge Cultural and Educational Foundation (founded by Chiuko [pinyin: Jiu Ge] Publishers, which was founded by Tsai Wen-fu) with the specific aim of encouraging the creation of children’s literature in Taiwan. Nine Songs refers to Jiu Ge, nine songs attributed to the poet Qu Yuan, in the third century BC. A list of award-winners with details of their books is available in Chinese.

25th Awards (2017)
104 works were considered were considered by judges Li Weiwen 李偉文, Ling Xingjie 凌性傑, Chen Anyi 陳安儀, Feng Jimei 馮季眉, You Peiyun 游珮芸
First Prize: 李明珊:《飛鞋》 - Li Mingshan
Prize: 范芸萍:《巴洛‧瓦旦》 - Fan Yunping
Prize: 董少尹:《網球少年》 - Dong Shaoyin
Prize: 李光福:《舞街少年》 - Li Guangfu
Prize: 劉美瑤:《撒野的憤怒馬桶》 - Liu Meiyao

24th Awards (2016)
121 works considered by judges: Ling Xingjie 凌性傑、Xu Jiankun 許建崑、Zhang Gui’e 張桂娥、Huang Qiufang 黃秋芳、Huang Cuihua 黃翠華
First Prize: 張英珉：《長跑少年》 - Zhang Yingmin
Prize: 評審獎：范芸萍《心靈魔方》 - Fan Yunping
Prize: 李光福：《棒球、鴨蛋和我》 - Li Guangfu
Prize: 李慧娟：《打發時間圖書館》 - Li Huijuan
Prize: 董少尹：《阿父塔繃牛兒！》 - Dong Shaoyin

16th Awards (2008)
First Prize: 鄭淑麗: 《月芽灣的寶藏》 - Zheng Shuli
Prize: 陸麗雅: 《阿祖的魔法天書》 - Li Liya
Prize: 陳韋任: 《灰姑娘變身日記》 - Chen Weiren
Prize: 洪雅齡: 《躲進部落格》 - Hong Yaling
Prize: 花格子: 《揚帆吧！八級風》 - Hua Gezi
Prize: 胡圓: 《勇闖「不管里」》 - Hu Yuan
Prize: 陳怡如: 《第十二張生肖卡》 - Chen Yiru
Prize: 孫昱: 《藍月亮，紅月亮》 - Sun Yu

15th Awards (2007)

First Prize: 鄭丞鈞：《帶著阿公走》 - Zheng Chengjun
Prize: 孫昱：《神祕島》 - Sun Yu
Prize: 蘇善：《凹凸星球》 - Su Shan
Prize: 姜子安：《金鑰匙》 - Jiang Zi'an
Prize: 蔡聖華: 《歡迎光臨幸福小館》 - Cai Shenghua
Prize: 陳韋任：紐約老鼠》 - Chen Weiren
Prize: 黃少芬：《夢與辣椒》 - Huang Shaofen
Prize: 李慧娟：《我的神祕訪客》 - Li Huijuan

14th Awards (2006)
Prize: 陳三義：《他不麻煩，他是我弟弟》 - Chen Sanyi
Prize: 劉美瑤：《網站奇緣》 - Liu Meiyao
Prize: 王文美：《女籃特攻隊》 - Wang Wenmei
Prize: 呂淑敏：《天使帶我轉個彎》 - Lv Shumin
Prize: 鄭丞鈞：《我的麗莎阿姨》 - Zheng Chengjun
Prize: 李慧娟：《走了一個小偷之後》 - Li Huijuan
Prize: 陳維鸚：《變身魔法石》 - Chen Weiying
Prize: 雪涅：《我們這一班》》 - Xue Nie
Prize: 陳三義：《他不麻煩，他是我弟弟(增訂新版)》 - Chen Sanyi

13th Awards (2005)
Prize: 劉翰師：《阿西跳月》   - Liu Hanshi
Prize: 謝鴻文：《老樹公在哭泣》 - Xie Hongwen
Prize: 雪涅：《拉薩小子》 - Xue Nie
Prize: 劉美瑤：《神秘的白塔》 - Liu Meiyao
Prize: 柯惠玲：《珊瑚男孩》 - Ke Huiling
Prize: 陳維：《變成松鼠的女孩》 - Chen Wei
Prize: 史冀儒：《尋找小丑族》 - Shi Jiru
Prize: 饒雪漫：《莞爾的幸福地圖》 - Rao Xueman

12th Awards (2004)
Prize: 毛威麟：《藍天鴿笭》 - Mao Weilin
Prize: 彭素華：《紅眼巨人》 - Peng Suhua
Prize: 呂紹澄：《有了一隻鴨子》 - Lv Shaocheng
Prize: 林杏亭：《流星雨》 - Lin Xingting
Prize: 姜天陸：《戰地春聲》 - Jiang Tianlu
Prize: 蘇善：《阿樂拜師》 - Su Shan
Prize: 王俍凱：《米呼米桑‧歡迎你》 - Wang Liangkai
Prize: 劉美瑤：《剝開橘子以後》 - Liu Meiyao

11th Awards (2003)
Prize: 林佑儒：《圖書館精靈》 - Lin Youru
Prize: 梁雅雯：《一樣的媽媽不一樣》 - Liang Yawen
Prize: 陸麗雅：《我家是鬼屋》 - Lu Liya
Prize: 劉碧玲：《貓女》 - Liu Biling
Prize: 饒雪漫：《花糖紙》 - Rao Xueman
Prize: 王文華：《年少青春紀事》 - Wang Wenhua
Prize: 王樂群：《基因猴王》 - Wang Lequn
Prize: 馬筱鳳：《泰雅少年巴隆》 - Ma Xiaofeng

10th Awards (2002)
Prize: 呂紹澄：《創意神豬》 - Lv Shaocheng
Prize: 李志偉：《七彩肥皂泡》 - Li Zhiwei
Prize: 林佩蓉：《風與天使的故鄉》 - Lin Peirong
Prize: 林舒嫺：《來去樂比樂》 - Lin Shuxian
Prize: 羅世孝：《下課鐘響》 - Luo Shixiao
Prize: 黃秋芳：《魔法雙眼皮》 - Huang Qiufang
Prize: 黃麗秋：《黃色蝴蝶結》 - Huang Liqiu
Prize: 鄭如晴：《少年鼓王》 - Zheng Ruqing
Prize: 陳沛慈：《寒冬中的報歲蘭》 - Chen Peici
Prize: 陳貴美：《陽光叔叔》 - Chen Guimei
Prize: 王蔚：《逃家奇遇記》 - Wang Wei
Prize: 盧振中：《尋找蟋蟀王》 - Lu Zhenzhong

9th Awards (2001)
Prize: 馮傑：《少年放蜂記》 - Feng Jie
Prize: 林音因：《藍天使》 - Lin Yinyin
Prize: 鄭宗弦：《媽祖回娘家》 - Zheng Zongxian
Prize: 陳貴美：《送奶奶回家》 - Chen Guimei
Prize: 陳肇宜：《我們的山》 - Chen Zhaoyi
Prize: 臧保琦：《河水，流呀流》 - Zang Baoqi
Prize: 王文華：《再見，大橋再見》 - Wang Wenhua
Prize: 王晶：《超級小偵探》 - Wang Jing

8th Awards (2000)
Prize: 鄭宗弦：《又見寒煙壺》 - Zheng Zongxian
Prize: 蒙永麗：《蒼白與憂鬱》 - Meng Yongli
Prize: 林音因：《期待》 - Lin Yinyin
Prize: 侯維玲：《二○九九》 - Hou Weiling
Prize: 鄒敦怜：《蘭花緣》 - Zou Dunlian
Prize: 王文華：《南昌大街》 - Wang Wenhua
Prize: 王晶：《世界毀滅之後》 - Wang Jing

7th Awards (1999)
Prize: 劉碧玲：《姊妹》 - Liu Biling
Prize: 匡立杰：《藍溪紀事》 - Kuang Lijie
Prize: 鄭宗弦：《第一百面金牌》 - Zheng Zongxian
Prize: 陳瑞璧：《阿公放蛇》 - Chen Ruibi
Prize: 劉俐綺：《蘋果日記》 - Liu Liqi

6th Awards (1998)
Prize: 劉臺痕：《鳳凰山傳奇》 - Liu Taihen
Prize: 盧振中：《荒原上的小涼棚》 - Lu Zhenzhong
Prize: 陳愫儀：《孿生國度》 - Chen Suyi
Prize: 姜子安：《我愛綠蠵龜》 - Jiang Zi'an
Prize: 鄭宗弦：《姑姑家的夏令營》 - Zheng Zongxian

5th Awards (1997)
Prize: 屠佳：《藍藍的天上白雲飄》 - Tu Jia
Prize: 林小晴：《紅帽子西西》 -  Lin Xiaoqing
Prize: 眠月：《少年行星》 - Mian Yue
Prize: 陳素宜：《選擇》 - Chen Suyi
Prize: 木子：《小子阿辛》 - Muzi

4th Awards (1996)
Prize: 莫劍蘭：《兩本日記》 - Mo Jianlan
Prize: 馮傑：《冬天裡的童話》 - Feng Jie
Prize: 盧振中：《阿高斯失蹤之謎》 - Lu Zhenzhong
Prize: 黃淑美：《永遠小孩》 - Huang Shumei
Prize: 陳素宜：《秀巒山上的金交椅》 - Chen Suyi

3rd Awards (1995)
Prize: 張永琛：《隱形恐龍鳥》 - Zhang Yongchen
Prize: 黃虹堅：《十三歲的深秋》 - Huang Hongjian
Prize: 張淑美：《老蕃王與小頭目》 - Zhang Shumei
Prize: 趙映雪：《奔向閃亮的日子》 - Zhao Yingxue
Prize: 陳素宜：《天才不老媽》 - Chen Suyi
Prize: 劉臺痕：《護命行動》 - Liu Taihen

2nd Awards (1994)
Prize: 馮傑：《飛翔的恐龍蛋》 - Feng Jie
Prize: 屠佳：《飛奔吧！黃耳朵》 - Tu Jia
Prize: 胡英音：《安妮的天空．安妮的夢》 - Hu Yingyin
Prize: 秦文君：《家有小丑》 - Qin Wenjun
Prize: 陳素燕：《少年曹丕》 - Chen Suyan
Prize: 陳曙光：《重返家園》 Chen Shuguang

1st Awards (1993)
Prize: 劉臺痕：《五十一世紀》 - Liu Taihen
Prize: 柯錦鋒：《我們的土地》 - Ke Jinfeng
Prize: 楊美玲、趙映雪：《茵茵的十歲願望》 - Yang Meiling and Hu Yingxue 
Prize: 戎林：《九龍闖三江》 - Rong Lin

References

Chinese children's writers
Awards established in 1992
Chinese children's literary awards
Chinese literary awards
Children's literary awards